Tiago de Oliveira Magalhaes  (a.k.a. Tiago Campos)  (born March 18, 1981) is a Brazilian baseball outfielder. He plays for Guarulhos Baseball Club in the Brazil Baseball League.

Career
He played in the Cincinnati Reds farm system from 2000-2004, but never moved above Class-A before he was released. He also apparently played in Japan at one point.

International career
He represented Brazil at the  2002 Intercontinental Cup, 2003 Baseball World Cup, 2005 Baseball World Cup, 2007 Pan American Games and the 2013 World Baseball Classic and 2019 Pan American Games Qualifier.

References

External links 

Baseball America

1981 births
Living people
Baseball players at the 2007 Pan American Games
Billings Mustangs players
Brazilian expatriate baseball players in Japan
Brazilian expatriate baseball players in the United States
Dayton Dragons players
Gulf Coast Reds players
Pan American Games competitors for Brazil
Sportspeople from São Paulo (state)
2013 World Baseball Classic players